The Softex-Aero V-24 is a proposed five place twin engined aircraft from Ukrainian-based Softex-Aero.

Design and development
The V-24 is a T-tailed twin engine composite construction pusher aircraft with retractable tricycle landing gear. The aircraft will be powered by either Rotax 912, or 160 hp  Lycoming IO-320 engines. The aircraft has a Galaxy GRS 1200 parachute system integrated into the airframe. Turboprop engines are also under consideration.

Variants
V-24
Rotax 912 power
V-24L
160hp  Lycoming IO-320
V-24TP
PBS TJ-100 turboprop power

Specifications (V-24)

References

External links
Softex-Aero
YouTube video
YouTube video

Twin-engined pusher aircraft